The Foundation for Asian American Independent Media is an arts education organization based in Chicago that focuses on Asian American art, history, and issues and hosts an annual Asian American Showcase.

History 
The Foundation for Asian American Independent Media (FAAIM) was founded in 1995 by journalist Ben Kim, and musicians Sooyoung Park and William Shin. Known then as Fortune4, the organization's first project was a New York Times- and MTV-lauded recording and subsequent tour of Asian American rock bands, entitled Ear of the Dragon. In 1996, the group created the Annual Chicago Asian American Showcase (the Showcase), the nation's only film festival dedicated exclusively to Asian American film. Incorporated as a not-for-profit in 1999, FAAIM works with other cultural institutions in Chicago on Asian-American media and education.

Since 2001 Tim Hugh has been the Executive Director of FAAIM. Other members include Vincent Chung and Larry Lee.

Asian American Showcase 
The Asian American Showcase is an annual film festival based in Chicago originally held at the Film Center at SAIC (now called the Gene Siskel Film Center). The Asian American Showcase exhibits independent films created by or about Asian Americans, as well as other media such as writing and music.

External links 
 
Interview with Tim Hugh http://via.library.depaul.edu/oral_his_series/51/
 Interview with Vincent Chung http://via.library.depaul.edu/oral_his_series/21/
 Interview with Vincent Pham http://via.library.depaul.edu/oral_his_series/22/
 Interview with Larry Lee http://via.library.depaul.edu/oral_his_series/14/
 Interview with Sam del Rosario http://via.library.depaul.edu/oral_his_series/18/

Art education organizations
Asian-American art
Organizations based in Chicago
Arts organizations established in 1995
1995 establishments in Illinois